Cyril James Morton (19 April 1903–25 June 1986) was a notable New Zealand film-maker. He was born in Wanganui, New Zealand on 19 April 1903.

References

1903 births
1986 deaths
New Zealand film directors